Heng Tola is a Cambodian film director and producer. Some of the films he has worked on include Villa Horror, Ghost Banana Tree, Pteah khmaoch tinh, and Gratefulness.

Background
Tola founded the film production company Campro Production with some of his friends in 2003. He was also the managing director of Kirirom Cinema which was located on Sihanouk Boulevard. He is the president of Ek Phnom Cinema which is located at Borey Raksmey, Battambang Province.

Career
His film Gratefulness which starred Ly Chan Siha was an award winning film. His film Ghost Banana Tree, released in 2004 was the fourth Campro production film. The 2005 horror film, The Forest received several award nominations at the Khmer National Film Festival. It managed to pick up the Best Special Effects award. Also that year, Pteah khmaoch tinh aka The Haunted House was released, starring Chan Nary,  Prak Sambath and  Huy Yaleng.

Tola has commented on the fluctuation of the Cambodian film industry, and how they could make it last.

References

External links
 

Cambodian film directors
Cambodian film producers